Edward Kay is a Canadian showrunner, screenwriter, producer, novelist and journalist with a background in both live-action and animated television comedy, as well as print journalism.

Kay spent four years as a writer and producer on the political satire, This Hour Has 22 Minutes, before becoming supervising producer of The Itch, a comedy series starring Jason Jones formerly of The Daily Show, and Jessica Holmes. Kay then co-created the animated children's series, Ollie's Under-the-Bed Adventures (later known as Olliver's Adventures) and wrote the pilot episode, which won a Gemini Award for Best Animated Program. He has written numerous episodes of Atomic Betty, a television series broadcast in more than 100 countries. With Sean Scott, he was the co-creator of Jimmy Two-Shoes, an animated comedy series that in December 2007, was put into production by broadcasters Disney XD and Teletoon. He is the co-creator of Finding Stuff Out, a comedy-inflected science show that airs on TVO and Knowledge Network.

Kay's first novel, a YA sc-fi comedy entitled STAR Academy,  was released September 15, 2009 by Random House/Doubleday. The sequel, Dark Secrets, was released on September 13, 2011. He subsequently was commissioned by Scholastic Books to write an historical novel about the Battle of the Atlantic, entitled Sink and Destroy, released in 2014.

His most recent novel is a thriller entitled At Rope's End, which was released by New York City based publisher Crooked Lane in January, 2017.

In 2019, Kay's first non-fiction title, Stinky Science, was released by Kids Can Press in Canada and by Hachette worldwide. A companion volume, Germy Science, was released in October 2021.

Kay's writing for This Hour Has 22 Minutes'' has garnered him three Gemini Awards, a Canadian Comedy Award, and a Canadian Screenwriting Award.  For his work in print journalism he has received two Canadian National Magazine Award Honourable Mentions.

Notes

External links

http://www.edwardkay.net
http://www.randomhouse.ca/catalog/display.pperl?isbn=9780385667067 

Canadian television writers
Journalists from Toronto
Writers from Toronto
Living people
Canadian comedy writers
Canadian male novelists
Canadian writers of young adult literature
Canadian historical novelists
Canadian science writers
21st-century Canadian novelists
21st-century Canadian male writers
21st-century Canadian non-fiction writers
21st-century Canadian screenwriters
Year of birth missing (living people)
Canadian Comedy Award winners